Wiekowice  (formerly German Wieck; not to be confused with the village currently called Wieck) is a village in the administrative district of Gmina Darłowo, within Sławno County, West Pomeranian Voivodeship, in north-western Poland.

For the history of the region, see History of Pomerania.

The village has a population of 460.

References

Wiekowice